Silvery Dust is a 1953 Soviet science fiction drama film directed by Pavel Armand and Abram Room and starring Mikhail Bolduman, Sofiya Pilyavskaya and Valentina Ushakova.

Synopsis

The film takes place in the United States. Samuel Steal is a scientist with only one life purpose - to become rich. The professor invents a powerful new weapon of mass destruction; a deadly radioactive silver-gray powder. To possess Steal's invention, a struggle between two military-industrial behemoth trusts involving gangsters begins.

Cast
 Mikhail Bolduman as Samuel Steal  
 Sofiya Pilyavskaya as Doris Steal  
 Valentina Ushakova as Jen O'Connel  
 Nikolai Timofeyev as Allan O'Connel  
 Vsevolod Larionov as Harry Steal  
 Vladimir Belokurov as Upton Bruce  
 Rostislav Plyatt as McKennedy  
 Grigori Kirillov as Dr. Kurt Schneider  
 Aleksandr Khanov as Charles Armstrong 
 Valeriy Lekarev as Gideon Smith  
 Gennadi Yudin as Dick Jones  
 Zana Zanoni as Mary Robinson  
 D. Kolmogorov as Ben Robinson  
 Aleksandr Pelevin as Joe Twist  
 Lidiya Smirnova as Flossy Beit 
 Osip Abdulov as Sheriff Smiles  
 Sergei Tsenin 
 Nadir Malishevsky 
 Aleksandr Shatov 
 Vladimir Savelev 
 Yuri Chekulayev 
 Arkadi Tsinman 
 Vladimir Sez 
 Isaak Leongarov 
 A. Arkadyeva  
 N. Nazaren   
 Robert Ross
 Konstantin Nemolyayev as Johnny  
 Fyodor Odinokov as Sheriff's Assistant 
 Leonid Pirogov as Detained Unemployed 
 Anna Zarzhitskaya as Deadley's Wife

References

Bibliography 
 Liehm, Mira & Liehm, Antonín J. The Most Important Art: Eastern European Film After 1945. University of California Press, 1977.

External links 
 

1953 films
1950s Russian-language films
Films directed by Abram Room
1950s science fiction drama films
Soviet science fiction drama films
Russian science fiction drama films
Mosfilm films
Mad scientist films
1953 drama films
Soviet black-and-white films